The Tehachapi Railroad Depot was a railroad station in Tehachapi, California. The depot was built in 1904 along a Southern Pacific Railroad line built in 1876; the railroad founded the town of Tehachapi and drew the residents of nearby Tehichipa to the new settlement. The depot served a significant section of railroad, as it was located near the Tehachapi Loop and was one of the most active rural stations during World War II. The station later served as a warehouse and a railroad office.

In 2008, the depot burned down; it was rebuilt in 2009 and now serves as the Tehachapi Depot Railroad Museum with historic railroad artifacts.

The original depot was added to the National Register of Historic Places on October 20, 1999. Although the original depot no longer exists, it remains on the National Register.

References

External links
 Tehachapi Depot Railroad Museum - official site

Museums in Kern County, California
Railroad museums in California
Tehachapi Mountains
Railway stations in the United States opened in 1904
National Register of Historic Places in Kern County, California
Railway stations on the National Register of Historic Places in California
Buildings and structures demolished in 2008
Former Southern Pacific Railroad stations in California